Presidential elections were held in Azerbaijan on 11 April 2018. 

The elections were the first since the 2016 constitutional referendum, which extended the presidential term from five to seven years. Incumbent President Ilham Aliyev was re-elected president for a seven-year term. The elections, which took place in an authoritarian context, were characterized as fraudulent. Major opposition parties were disqualified before the election. Eight candidates ran for the presidency, although there were doubts as to whether the opposition candidates were genuine candidates.

Background
Article 178 §1 of the electoral law sets the third Wednesday of October as the date for presidential elections, which would have meant the elections were held on 17 October 2018. However, the vote was unexpectedly brought forward by a presidential decree on 5 February 2018. Azerbaijan's Central Election Commission (CEC) held a poll on 1 February 2018 on the preparation and delivery of double cabins for the voting room.

Electoral system
The President of Azerbaijan is elected using the two-round system; if no candidate receives a majority of the vote in the first round, a run-off is held. Polls opened nationwide at 08:00 and closed at 19:00.

Candidates
Ilham Aliyev – incumbent President of Azerbaijan since 2003, chairman of the New Azerbaijan Party.
Razi Nurullayev – political analyst, former deputy chairman of Azerbaijani Popular Front Party.
Sardar Jalaloglu - politician, chairman of Azerbaijan Democratic Party. Previously ran for president in 2013.
Zahid Oruc - member of the Parliament of Azerbaijan since 2001. Former deputy chairman of Motherland Party. Ran for president in 2013 and placed 5th.
Hafiz Hajiyev – chairman of the Modern Equality Party, previously participated in the 2003, 2008 and 2013 elections.
Gudrat Hasanguliyev – member of the Parliament of Azerbaijan, chairman of the Whole Azerbaijan Popular Front Party. Previously participated in the 2003, 2008 and 2013 elections.
Araz Alizadeh – member of the Parliament of Azerbaijan, chairman of the Social Democratic Party of Azerbaijan. Previously participated in the 2013 presidential elections and finished seventh.
Faraj Guliyev – member of the Parliament of Azerbaijan, chairman of the National Revival Movement Party. Previously participated in the 2013 presidential elections and finished eighth.

The National Council of Democratic Forces (NCDF) decided to boycott the elections and intends to launch protests against the elections. Another organisation, the Republican Alternative Movement (REAL), also announced that it would not recognize the results of the elections, calling them as a "hasty and unjustified step". On 10 February the Musavat Party announced that it would also boycott the elections and its leader Isa Gambar would not run for president. The same day, another opposition party, the Party of Hope, also announced that they would not participate in the elections.

Conduct
The Organization for Security and Co-operation in Europe (OSCE) announced that the election was not free and fair. In a press conference the day after the election, the OSCE found that there was "widespread disregard for mandatory procedures, a lack of transparency, and numerous serious irregularities, including ballot box stuffing." Aliyev's supporters took to disrupting the press conference and accused the international observation mission of bias.

Polls

Opinion polls
A poll by ELS on 27 March found that 84.1% of respondents intended to vote for Aliyev. A poll by AJF & Associates on 28 March concluded that 82.9% or respondents intended to vote for Aliyev.

Exit polls

Results

References

Azerbaijan
Azerbaijan
Presidential election, 2018
April 2018 events in Europe
April 2018 events in Asia
Presidential elections in Azerbaijan